The lunette spatial region in the upper portion of stelas, became common for stelas as a prelude to a stele's topic. Its major use was from ancient Egypt in all the various categories of stelas: funerary, Victory stelas, autobiographical, temple, votive, etc.

The lunettes are most common from ancient Egyptian stelas, as not only is the topic of the stele presented, but honorific gods, presenters, individuals, etc. are previewed, and often with Egyptian hieroglyphic statements.

The main body of the stele is then presented below, often separated with a horizontal line (register), but not always. In Egyptian stelas, many have horizontal lines of hieroglyphs; often the lunette will contain shorter vertical statements in hieroglyphs, sometimes just names of the individuals portrayed, hieroglyphs in front, or behind the individual.

19th Dynasty Egypt, post Amarna

From the post-Amarna period onwards, many personal stelas made exhortations to the ancient Egyptian deities; stelas to specific gods "were erected to intervene personally with the local god, often to seek justice or offer an explanation for things that had gone wrong in their lives. The deceased is shown kneeling, holding up his hands in prayer, ....." Some of the personal votive stelas had ears (hieroglyphs), to represent the gods listening to the supplicant.

Gallery

Ancient Eyptian

Non-Egyptian

References

Hobson, The World of the Pharaohs: a Complete Guide to Ancient Egypt, Christine Hobson, c 1997, Thames and Hudson, {softcover, }

Steles
Ancient Egyptian stelas